Mark Twain: Words & Music is a double-CD produced by Grammy Award-winner Carl Jackson, a Bluegrass and Country music artist, as a benefit for the Mark Twain Boyhood Home & Museum, a non-profit foundation in Hannibal, Missouri. The project tells the life story of Mark Twain (Samuel Clemens) in spoken word and song and features many well-known artists. "Run Mississippi" by Rhonda Vincent reached #2 on the Bluegrass Today charts the same week that "Comet Ride" by Ricky Skaggs reached #7. The album was released on September 21, 2011 and is the most downloaded Americana album of all time on AirPlay Direct, an online music source for radio stations, with more than 7,000 downloads its first year.

The spoken word passages include narration and excerpts from Twain's writing to form the biography. Corresponding songs follow each spoken word track to further tell the story of the Missouri boy who grew up alongside the Mississippi River and eventually became America's most popular author. Jimmy Buffett provides the voice of Huckleberry Finn, Garrison Keillor narrates, Clint Eastwood voices Mark Twain, and Angela Lovell performs as Twain's daughter, Susy Clemens. Singers include Emmylou Harris, Doyle Lawson & Quicksilver, Rhonda Vincent, Bradley Walker, Carl Jackson, The Church Sisters, Sheryl Crow, Brad Paisley, Marty Raybon, Val Storey, Vince Gill, Joe Diffie, and Ricky Skaggs. The album includes several new songs written specifically for the project.  Museum director Cindy Lovell conceived the project. She wrote the narrative for the spoken word passages and served as executive producer with Carl Jackson.

Track listing 1
Disc One
 "Hello yourself, and see how you like it..." (Narrative: Mark Twain/Cindy Lovell; Background score: "Comet Ride" performed by Andy Leftwich) Jimmy Buffett, Garrison Keillor, Clint Eastwood – 1:24
 "When Halley Came To Jackson" (Mary Chapin Carpenter) Emmylou Harris – 3:11
 "Hannibal, Missouri, where my boyhood was spent..." (Narrative: Mark Twain/Cindy Lovell; Background score: "Comet Ride" performed by Carl Jackson/Andy Leftwich; "Uncle John's Farm" written and performed by Carl Jackson) Garrison Keillor, Jimmy Buffett, Clint Eastwood – 6:28
 "Better Times A' Comin'" (Cal Veale) Doyle Lawson & Quicksilver – 2:37
 "He agreed to teach me the Mississippi River..." (Narrative: Mark Twain/Cindy Lovell; Background score: "Run Mississippi" performed by Carl Jackson) Garrison Keillor, Jimmy Buffett, Clint Eastwood – 3:44
 "Run Mississippi" (Priscilla Houliston/Carl Jackson) Rhonda Vincent – 2:59
 "Several years of variegated vagabondizing..." (Narrative: Mark Twain/Cindy Lovell; Background score: Medley: "Dixie," "Ink," and "Mexican Telegram" arranged and performed by Carl Jackson; "Dixie" written by Daniel D. Emmett, "Mexican Telegram" written by Carl Jackson) Garrison Keillor, Jimmy Buffett, Clint Eastwood – 2:29
 "A Cowboy In His Soul" (Bryan Kennedy/Jim Rushing) Bradley Walker – 2:07
 "It liberates the vandal to travel..." (Narrative: Mark Twain/Cindy Lovell; Background score: "Safe Water" performed by Carl Jackson) Garrison Keillor, Jimmy Buffett, Clint Eastwood – 1:51
 "Safe Water" (Carl Jackson/Jerry Salley) Carl Jackson – 3:37
 "You ain't ever to love anybody but me..." (Narrative: Mark Twain/Cindy Lovell; Background score: "Sam & Livy" written and performed by Carl Jackson) Garrison Keillor, Clint Eastwood – 2:07
 "I Wandered By A Brookside" (Traditional/Music by Barbara Berry) The Church Sisters – 3:37
 "It was a mighty nice family..." (Narrative: Mark Twain/Cindy Lovell; Background score: "Little Creatures" written and performed by Carl Jackson) Garrison Keillor, Clint Eastwood, Angela Lovell – 3:49
 "Beautiful Dreamer" (Stephen Foster) Sheryl Crow – 2:06

Track listing 2
Disc Two
 "Don't scrunch up like that, Huckleberry..." (Narrative: Mark Twain/Cindy Lovell; Background score: "Comet Ride" performed by Carl Jackson) Garrison Keillor, Clint Eastwood, Jimmy Buffett – 2:11
 "Huck Finn Blues" (Emily Hayes, Carl Jackson, Danny Wilson) Brad Paisley – 5:36
 "The crows would gather on the railing and talk about me..." (Narrative: Mark Twain/Cindy Lovell; Background score: "Indian Crow" performed by Carl Jackson) Garrison Keillor, Clint Eastwood – 2:51
 "Indian Crow" – (Carl Jackson/Jerry Salley) Marty Raybon – 3:39
 "So wounded, so broken-hearted..." (Narrative: Mark Twain/Cindy Lovell; Background score: "Tick, Tock, Tick..." written and performed by Carl Jackson) Garrison Keillor, Clint Eastwood – 2:31
 "Love Is On Our Side" (Tish Hinojosa) Val Storey – 3:50
 "Wheresoever she was, there was Eden..." (Narrative: Mark Twain/Cindy Lovell; Background score: "Safe Water" performed by Carl Jackson) Garrison Keillor, Clint Eastwood – 2:18
 "I Know You By Heart" (Eve Nelson/Diane Scanlon) Vince Gill – 3:58
 "My conscience got to stirring me up hotter than ever..." (Narrative: Mark Twain/Cindy Lovell; Background score: "Indian Crow" performed by Rob Ickes) Garrison Keillor, Clint Eastwood, Jimmy Buffett – 3:21
 "Ink" (Carl Jackson/Don Poythress/Tony Wood) Joe Diffie – 4:32
 "The report of my death was an exaggeration..." (Narrative: Mark Twain/Cindy Lovell; Background score: "Comet Ride" performed by Carl Jackson) Garrison Keillor, Clint Eastwood, Jimmy Buffett 1:29
 "Comet Ride" (Carl Jackson) Ricky Skaggs – 2:52
 "The truth, mainly..." (Narrative: Mark Twain/Cindy Lovell; Background score: "Beautiful Dreamer" performed by Catherine Marx) Jimmy Buffett, Garrison Keillor – 2:03

Personnel
Carl Jackson: Acoustic Guitar, Banjo, Gut String Guitar, Lead Vocal, Baritone Vocal, Tenor Vocal, Background Vocal, High Baritone Vocal
Jimmy Buffett: Spoken Word
Garrison Keillor: Spoken Word
Clint Eastwood: Spoken Word
Joey Martin: Tenor Vocal
Tony Creasman: Drums, Percussion
Kevin Grantt: Bass
Catherine Marx: Piano, Synth
Andy Leftwich: Fiddle
Adam Steffey: Mandolin
Corey Hensley: Lead Vocal
Josh Swift: Dobro, Low Tenor Vocal
Doyle Lawson: Mandolin, Baritone Vocal
Dale Perry: Banjo
Rhonda Vincent: Lead Vocal
Sonya Isaacs: Tenor Vocal, High Baritone Vocal
Rob Ickes: Dobro, Weisenborn
Bradley Walker: Lead Vocal
Cia Cherryholmes: High Baritone Vocal, Tenor Vocal
Jerry Salley: Background Vocal, Tenor Vocal
Mike Johnson: Steel
Savannah Church: Lead Vocal
Sarah Church: Tenor Vocal
Angela Lovell: Spoken Word
Sheryl Crow: Lead Vocal
Brad Paisley: Acoustic Guitar, Lead Vocal
Marty Raybon: Lead Vocal
Johnny Rawls: Banjo
Val Storey: Lead Vocal
Vince Gill: Lead Vocal
Joe Diffie: Lead Vocal
Ricky Skaggs: Lead Vocal

Technical personnel
Carl Jackson: Producer, Executive Producer
Cindy Lovell: Executive Producer
Kyle Manner: Engineer
John (Hip-Hop) Caldwell: Engineer
Jimmy Buffett: Engineer
Noah Smith: Engineer
Carlos Martin: Engineer
Jim Smith: Engineer
Richard Barrow: Engineer
Kendal Marcy: Engineer
Drew Bollman: Engineer
Lee Groitzsch: Engineer
Luke Wooten: Mixing, Mastering

Reviews
The reviews of the album have been positive. Shortly after the album's release the "L.A. Times" review noted, "Producer Carl Jackson and his co-executive producer Cindy Lovell show deep respect and affection for Twain’s estimable place in American culture." Allmusic wrote that the album was "a celebration of Twain's life and work that, if a bit muted and careful, is a pleasing journey through the world of Twain", while Americana Music News noted the "remarkable line-up," and "Outlaw Magazine"'s Gregg Andrews wrote, "Thanks to the excellent interplay between the narrative and songs, the CD gives listeners a fascinating introduction to Mark Twain." The album ranked 28 in Folk Music the week of July 6, 2012.

References

 Mark Twain: Words & Music liner notes

External links
 Mark Twain: Words & Music
 

Works about Mark Twain
Americana albums
Country albums by American artists
Bluegrass albums
Spoken word albums by American artists
2011 albums
Adaptations of works by Mark Twain
Mailboat Records albums
2010s spoken word albums